Vallée is a French surname. Notable people with the surname include:

André Vallée (1930–2015), Canadian Roman Catholic bishop
Anne Vallée (born 1958), Canadian biologist
Bernard Vallée (born 1945), French fencer
Brigitte Vallée (born 1950), French mathematician and computer scientist
Charles Vallée, French archer
Claire Vallée (born 1980), French chef
Jacques Vallée (born 1939), French astronomer and venture capitalist
Jean Vallée (born 1941), Belgian singer
Jean-Marc Vallée (born 1963), Canadian film director and screenwriter
Marcel Vallée (1880–1957), French actor
Robert Vallée (1922–2017), French cyberneticist and mathematician
Rudy Vallée (1901–1986), American singer and actor
Stéphanie Vallée (born 1971), Canadian lawyer and politician
Yvonne Vallée (1899–1996), French actress

See also
La Vallée (disambiguation)
Valle (disambiguation)
Vallé (disambiguation)
Valee (disambiguation)
Air Vallée, an Italian airline

French-language surnames